The 2013 Júbilo Iwata season saw the club compete in the J1 League, the top league of Japanese football, in which they finished 17th.

J1 League

League table

Match details

References

External links
 J.League official site

Júbilo Iwata
Júbilo Iwata seasons